"Too Young for Promises" is a song written by Leon Berger and recorded by the Australian/New Zealand band Koo De Tah. It was released as the band's debut single in June 1985 and peaked at number 6 on the Australian Kent Music Report. The single was also released via the Mercury Record Label in South Africa and was immensely popular on radio and in clubs, but relegated to the HiNRG genre, hence failed to make a dent on the Springbok Singles Charts.

The song was featured in the 1984 film Streets of Fire, starring Michael Paré and Diane Lane.

Track listing
 7" Single (880 673-7)
 Side A "Too Young for Promises" - 4:02
 Side B "Dancing (Towards the Stranger)" - 3:35

 12" Single (880 673-1)
 Side A "Too Young for Promises"  (Extended Mix)  - 6:52
 Side B "Dancing (Towards the Stranger)"  (Dance Mix) - 5:23

Charts

Weekly charts

Year-end charts

Cover Versions
 In 2012, StereoLove featuring Tina Cross covered the song.

References 

1985 songs
1985 singles
PolyGram singles
Songs written by Leon Berger